Kyra is a feminine given name that may derive from the Greek word kurá (meaning lady) or from Cyra, the feminine form of Cyrus. Notable people with the name include:

Kyra Tirana Barry (born 1966), American wrestling leader
Kyra Harris Bolden, American attorney 
Kyra Carusa (born 1995), American footballer
Kyra Christmas (born 1997), Canadian Olympic athlete
Kyra Condie (born 1996), American rock climber
Kyra Constantine (born 1998), African-Canadian Olympic athlete
Kyra Cooney-Cross (born 2002), Australian soccer player
Kyra Davis, American mystery novelist
Kyra Dickinson (born 1993), Canadian footballer
Kyra Downton (1913–1999), American equestrian
Kyra Dutt (born 1991), Indian film actress
Kyra Edwards (born 1997), British rower
Kyra Elzy (born 1978), African-American basketball team coach
Kyra Fortuin (born 1997), Dutch field hockey player
Kyra Frosini (1773–1801), Greek socialite
Kyra Gaunt, American professor
Kyra Giorgi (born 1977), Australian author
Kyra Gracie (born 1985), Brazilian jiu-jitsu practitioner
Kyra E. Hicks (born 1965), American author
Kyra T. Inachin (1968–2012), German historian
Kyra Jefferson (born 1994), American professional sprinter
Kyra Kyrklund (born 1951), Finnish dressage rider and trainer
Kyra Lamberink (born 1996), Dutch track cyclist
Kyra Malinowski (born 1993), German football player
Kyra Markham (1891–1967), American painter and actress
Kyra Montes (born 1998), American-Nicaraguan footballer
Kyra Nichols (born 1958), American ballet dancer and teacher
Kyra Nijinsky (1914–1998), Russian ballet dancer
Kyra Phillips (born 1968), American correspondent
Kyra Reznikov, South Australian lawyer
Kyra Sedgwick (born 1965), American actress
Kyra Shroff (born 1992), Indian tennis player
Kyra Simon (born 2002), Australian rugby union player
Kyra Sundance (born 1970), American dog trainer, performer and author
Kyra Vassiliki (1789–1834), Greek woman
Kyra Vayne (1916–2001), Russian-born British opera singer
Kyra Petrovskaya Wayne (1918–2018), American-Russian author
Kyra Zagorsky (born 1976), American film actress

See also
 Kyra (disambiguation)
 Cyra (name)
 Kiera, a given name
 Kira (disambiguation)
 Kyla (disambiguation)

References 

English feminine given names